Blood lily is a common name for several plants and may refer to:

 the genus Haemanthus collectively, particularly
 Haemanthus coccineus, a scarlet-flowered bulbous plant native to southern Africa
 the genus Scadoxus collectively, particularly
 Scadoxus multiflorus, a red-flowered bulbous plant native to much of Africa and parts of the Arabian peninsula
 Scadoxus puniceus, a red-flowered bulbous plant native to southern and eastern Africa

See also

Plants known as blood flower, including:
 Asclepias curassavica, an American tropical milkweed